The following places are called Bures:
Bures, Orne, a commune of France in the department of Orne
Bures, Meurthe-et-Moselle, a commune of France in the department of Meurthe-et-Moselle
Bures-en-Bray, a commune of France in the department of Seine-Maritime
Bures-les-Monts, a commune of France in the department of Calvados
Bures-sur-Yvette, a commune of France in the department of Essonne
Bures, England, a village that straddles the county border between Suffolk and Essex
Bures Hamlet, the portion of the village in Essex
Bures St. Mary, the portion of the village in Suffolk
Bures, Saskatchewan, a hamlet in Saskatchewan, Canada

See also 
 Bureš, a Czech surname
 Mount Bures, Essex, England